Fox is one of the leading free to air TV networks broadcasting in Turkey. Since July 2012, Fox TV broadcasts in 16:9.

History
The channel was originally TGRT (acronym in turkish as: 'Türkiye Gazetesi Radyo Televizyonu'; Turkey Newspaper Radio Television) and began broadcasting on April 23, 1993, under İhlas Holding. Between 2001 and 2004, TGRT was owned by Tasarruf Mevduatı Sigorta Fonu before being sold again to İhlas Holding.

On July 23, 2006, News Corporation acquired TGRT from İhlas Holding, and was formed by Ahmet Ertegün. The channel was later relaunched as Fox on February 24, 2007.
David Parker Reid was the General Manager of Fox Turkey between 2006 and 2009. David Parker Reid, Hakan Etus, Koray Altinsoy, Doğan Şentürk played crucial role as the most senior executives about the establishment of the Fox channel in Turkey. After David Parker Reid's leave, Pietro Vicari served as General Manager from 2009 to 2014. On November 26, 2014, Adam Theiler was appointed as the General Manager of Fox TV.

Programs broadcast by Fox

Unlike other international Fox channels which generally focus on syndicated programmes primarily from the United States, Fox Turkey focuses on original programming.

References

External links
Official website
Fox (Turkey) at LyngSat Address

Television stations in Turkey
Television channels and stations established in 2007
Turkey
Turkish-language television stations